Snehadeepam is a 1962 Malayalam language film, directed and produced by P. Subramaniam. Written by novelist Muttathu Varkey, it stars Thikkurissy Sukumaran Nair, Kottarakkara Sreedharan Nair, S. P. Pillai, Miss Kumari, Ambika, Santhi, Baby Vinodini, Adoor Pankajam, T. K. Balachandran and Aranmula Ponnamma.

Cast

 Thikkurissy Sukumaran Nair as Sreedharan
 Adoor Pankajam as Kochu Narayani/Naani
 Ambika Sukumaran as Vilasini
 Baby Vinodini (Vinodini Sasimohan) as Usha
 Kottarakkara Sreedharan Nair as Sankar
 Miss Kumari as Lakshmi
 S. P. Pillai as Njaramban/Karnan
 K. V. Shanthi as Prabha
 T. K. Balachandran as Chandran
Pankajavalli as Devakiyamma
Aranmula Ponnamma as Kalyani
Vanchiyoor Radha as Madhavi
Kaduvakulam Antony as Factory worker

Soundtrack 
The music was composed by M. B. Sreenivasan and lyrics were written by P. Bhaskaran.

References

1962 films
1960s Malayalam-language films
Films directed by P. Subramaniam